Until the End is the third album by the Canadian heavy metal band Kittie, released by independent label Artemis in 2004. It included the single "Into the Darkness" which made its way to radio stations in June that year. A music video was also produced for the song. "Into The Darkness" made its video debut on MTV2's Headbangers Ball and peaked at #41 on the US 'Radio & Records Active Rock Songs' chart and #116 on the Official UK Singles Chart. The track "Red Flags" was also released as a promotional single in the fall of 2004. The track "Pussy Sugar" also received significant airplay on the Hard Attack satellite radio station. It was the only album to feature Jennifer Arroyo on bass.

The album debuted at #105 in the Billboard Top 200, selling 19,000 copies.

Track listing
All songs written by Morgan Lander and Mercedes Lander.

The official title of track 5 is "Pussy Sugar", but is often referred to as only "Sugar".

Personnel
Main
Morgan Lander - guitars, vocals
Jennifer Arroyo - bass
Mercedes Lander - drums
Additional
Steve Thompson - producer, mixing
Ian Hatton - engineer
John Arraya - guitar technician
Ted Jensen - mastering
Mike Lapierre - engineer
Geoff Mack - artwork
John Magnum - drum technician
Devin O'Connell - engineer
Morgan Lander - artwork
Reinhold Scherer - photography
Brett Weiss - layout design

References

External links

2004 albums
Kittie albums
Artemis Records albums
Albums recorded at Long View Farm

Groove metal albums